Gerad Tehran Club is a professional wrestling team based in Tehran, Iran.

Squad
As of February 2009:

References

Sport in Tehran
Sport in Iran
Wrestling clubs